Naeem Ashraf (نعیم اشرف) is a British Pakistani cricket umpire and former cricketer who played two One Day International matches in 1995. Naeem is a left-arm fast-medium bowler and a left-handed batsman.

Naeem now plays for Clitheroe Cricket Club in Lancashire, England. Naeem is a fully qualified cricket coach and coaches on behalf of the Lancashire Cricket Board.
In 2010, Naeem became a qualified ACO Umpire a step which he was very proud of achieving. Naeem enjoys being part of Cricket, whether it is being a Cricketer, Coach or an Umpire.

Family, education, and personal life
Naeem Ashraf was born to Azra Begum and Mohammed Ashraf, a housewife and business owner in Lahore. Naeem who is also known as Nomme by his close friends and family grew up in a middle-class family with six brothers and three sisters, Naeem is the third eldest brother in the family. Naeem was educated at Muslim Model High School in Lahore and M.A.O. College in Lahore.

In England, during a summer cricket match of 2000, Naeem met his partner Jasmine. 
On 15 June 2000, Naeem married Jasmine in an Islamic ceremony among family and friends. Three months later, on 12 September they were married again in a civil ceremony. The union produced three sons, Shazaib Naeem (born 14 September 2001), Umair Naeem (born 5 August 2003) and Zahir Naeem (born 14 November 2006). Naeem, still an energetic cricketer now resides in England with his wife and sons.

Cricket career

Growing up Naeem was a shy and quiet boy, but at the age of nine Naeem began to have a passion for cricket. Naeem was only ten when he played his first cricket match, he enjoyed it so much that he was asked to play for his school cricket team. This opportunity gave Naeem an opening to really shine, it wasn't long before Naeem became the team captain. Naeem then went on to play for all age groups surpassing his expectations on every level.
Meanwhile, future opportunities were on their way for Naeem, he finally got his big break which he was always waiting for. The chance came with the opportunity to play for his country, Pakistan. Naeem was so thrilled with this opportunity that there he played with his undivided passion, this then gave Naeem the chance to go on and participate in the Hong Kong sixes in Hong Kong, but more was in store for this energetic cricketer. Following his amazing performances he then got the chance to travel, and it wasn't long before Naeem landed in England.

In 1995, Naeem joined Read Cricket Club in Read as their professional cricketer. 
Then in 1997 Naeem joined Cherry Tree Cricket Club in Blackburn as their professional. He then went on to play for CTCC for over seven years, departing in 2003. Naeem even helped CTCC in winning their first double League and Cup win making it in the history book for CTCC in 1997 . During the seven years CTCC played six cup finals, winning three finals and two League Championships .

In 2004, Naeem joined Little Lever Cricket Club in Bolton. Following on, in 2005 and 2006 Naeem joined Clitheroe Cricket Club in Clitheroe. They went on to become Treble Winners in 2006, winning the League Championship, the Twenty20 and the Ramsbottom Cup. They were also the runners up for the League championship in 2005. Naeem also got the opportunity to play alongside his dearest friend Shahid Nawaz.

Naeem then joined Blackburn Northern Cricket Club in Blackburn in 2007. Naeem became the captain of the team and helped BNCC in winning their first League Championships and Ramsbottom Cup ever. At the annual Ribblesdale League's Senior League Trophy and Ramsbottom Cup presentation night Naeem was awarded the Senior League player of the year and best batting award, a night which Naeem always remembers .

Then in 2008, he went on to join Blackrod Cricket Club in Bolton a season which Naeem adored very much. In 2009, for a second time Naeem joined Blackburn Northern Cricket Club again.

Then in 2010 and 2011 Naeem joined Clitheroe Cricket Club. In 2010 Clitheroe CC went on to win the Ribblesdale Cricket League once again . The win was a great achievement for Naeem, who was very proud of the determination of his team. In 2011, Naeem was asked to be the captain of Clitheroe Cricket Club a proposal which Naeem was delighted with, Naeem gratefully accepted , . Naeem knew that the season was going to be a difficult and demanding one but Naeem was always up for the challenge , . Clitheroe CC came in sixth position but Naeem was still pleased and very proud of his team, saying "We never won but there is always next season".

Then came the chance of a lifetime for Naeem, in 2011, he was asked to go and play the USA Open T20 cricket tournament in Miami, Florida . Accompanied with his team the Sixer Sports they headed out for the tournament. It was an amazing opportunity which gave Naeem the chance to meet some old friends and make some new ones along the way. Naeem had such an amazing time and played with all his heart that he was asked to take part again in 2012 in the 2nd Annual International Weekend  at Palm Beach, Miami . Naeem adored the time he was given to play in Miami that he is hoping to play again in the near future.

In 2009 Naeem attended a refresher course, which assisted him to go onto do a Level 1 in Umpiring. The course inspired Naeem to progress and achieve his Level 1A in 2011. In 2013 Naeem completed Level 2 in umpiring, making him more determined to go on and complete his Level 3 in 2014.

In 2010, Naeem was given the opportunity to go and umpire in his home country of Pakistan. Naeem umpired 8 matches, which included LCA – Lahore Cricket Association matches and Inter-League cricket championships. Naeem also umpired in the Lancashire Cricket league from 2010 – 2013, These matches include umpiring for the Bolton Associations, Lancashire League, Lancashire U13/ Youth 16, 2 Day Match for U19, LCB Knock Out Cup as well as Naeem's first ECB Inter-University match. Naeem is going onto umpire in the Lancashire Cricket League in 2014.

References 

1972 births
Living people
British people of Punjabi descent
English cricketers
English cricket umpires
Pakistani cricketers
Pakistan One Day International cricketers
Lahore City cricketers
Lahore Whites cricketers
National Bank of Pakistan cricketers
British Asian cricketers
British sportspeople of Pakistani descent
Pakistani emigrants to the United Kingdom
Cricketers from Lahore